Justice League: The New Frontier is a 2008 American animated superhero film adapted from the DC Comics limited series DC: The New Frontier. The film was written by Stan Berkowitz, with Darwyn Cooke providing additional material.

The film received a rating of PG-13 for violent content and images, and was released on February 26, 2008. It is the second film of the DC Universe Animated Original Movies by Warner Bros. Animation.

The film had its broadcast premiere on October 18, 2008 on Cartoon Network. It was broadcast again on December 20, 2020 on Cartoon Network's nighttime Adult Swim programming block through Toonami, as a celebration for the then-upcoming release of Wonder Woman 1984.

Plot
An unknown entity, named "The Centre," tells its story about how it was born from the Earth itself and has witnessed the evolution of the dinosaurs, the meteor shower, and mankind's evolution. Due to man's capacity for war and violence, the Centre has concluded that they must be eradicated.

At the end of the Korean War, United States Air Force pilot Hal Jordan and his wingman, Kyle "Ace" Morgan, are attacked by enemy pilots but survive. In Gotham, J'onn J'onzz – the last survivor of the Green Martian race – is teleported to Earth; unable to return, J'onn disguises himself. In Las Vegas, Iris West is on the telephone with her fiancé Barry Allen – also known as the Flash – at a casino when Captain Cold arrives to commit robbery; he races from Central City to confront Cold. Flash finds the five bombs hidden by Cold and captures him, before Cold is possessed by an entity.

Two years later J'onn (as John Jones) is now working as a detective with the Gotham City Police Department, investigating a doomsday cult that worships the "Centre" and has kidnapped a child for a sacrificial ritual.  J'onn and his partner Slam Bradley join Batman in battling the cult, but a fire renders J'onn powerless. The cult leader is possessed by the entity, and warns of impending judgement. Hal is training under Col. Rick Flag at Ferris Aircraft for a U.S. government project to build a spacecraft for travel to Mars. Special agent King Faraday oversees the project.

Batman suggests to J'onn that they work together in investigating the Centre-worshiping cult. After being attacked and nearly subdued by the US government, a disillusioned Flash announces his retirement. J'onn interrogates former Ferris employee Harry Leiter, apprehended for murder while under The Centre's influence, who tells them about the launch to Mars.  When Faraday arrives, J'onn briefly reads his mind and learns Leiter is telling the truth. Seeing the jubilant albeit contemptuous response to the Flash's retirement, J'onn gives his research to Batman and plans to return to Mars on the rocket. J'onn and Faraday fight on the launchpad; the rocket is damaged and malfunctions after leaving Earth's atmosphere. Hal wants to attempt a landing but Flag reveals weapons of mass destruction are on board, intended to destroy all life on Mars. Hal is ejected from the cockpit and saved by Superman; Flag detonates the rocket as J'onn is held prisoner.

On Paradise Island, Wonder Woman is training with Mala when the Amazons are attacked by The Centre. As a result of Flag's rocket explosion, a fatally wounded Abin Sur crash-lands on Earth, gives his ring to Hal and tells him of The Centre, a monstrous creature that seeks the destruction of humans. Meanwhile, Superman and Batman review J'onn's research. Wonder Woman's invisible jet crashes at Cape Canaveral and she warns Superman that The Centre is coming. J'onn decides to help save Earth after his hope for humanity is renewed. The Centre, a massive flying island with an army of mutant dinosaurs to guard it, begins its attack on America.  The Flash, Green Arrow, Adam Strange, the Challengers of the Unknown, and the Blackhawks join forces with the US forces to defend the Cape.  Superman reconnoiters the Centre but is seemingly killed. Moved by his efforts, the heroes plan a frontal assault to provide cover for Hal and Ace while they fly a bombing mission into the creature.  At the same time the Flash, equipped with Ray Palmer's reduction ray, will crisscross the island, hoping to destabilize the island's atomic structure.

The aerial assault is nearly outmatched, and as a herd of dinosaurs ambush Faraday's ground forces, the Centre's psychic force briefly overwhelms J'onn. Faraday is captured by a dinosaur and both perish after Faraday sets off hand grenades. Hal and Ace shoot their way into The Centre's core but a hallucinogenic attack disorients them. Hal's ring relays instructions from the Guardians of the Universe on its use. Ace detonates his payload as Hal rescues him. The Flash races across the ocean, leaps onto The Centre's surface and covers it on foot, shrinking the island.  Hal envelops the island in green energy, towing it into space where it explodes. As the team celebrates their victory a glowing light emerges from the water and Aquaman emerges from a submarine carrying Superman.

The world celebrates the Centre's defeat with a ceremony. The film ends with a montage of various heroes and villains, including the birth of the Justice League set to the titular John F. Kennedy speech.

Cast

 Jeremy Sisto as Bruce Wayne / Batman
 David Boreanaz as Hal Jordan / Green Lantern
 Miguel Ferrer as J'onn J'onzz / John Jones / Martian Manhunter
 Neil Patrick Harris as Barry Allen / The Flash
 John Heard as Ace Morgan
 Lucy Lawless as Diana Prince / Wonder Woman
 Kyle MacLachlan as Kal-El / Clark Kent / Superman
 Lex Lang as Rick Flag, Arthur Curry / Aquaman (uncredited)
 Phil Morris as King Faraday
 Kyra Sedgwick as Lois Lane
 Brooke Shields as Carol Ferris
 Joe Alaskey as Bugs Bunny 
 Jeff Bennett as Sportscaster
 Corey Burton as Abin Sur, Ray Palmer (uncredited)
 Townsend Coleman as Dr. Magnus
 Keith David as The Centre
 Sean Donnellan as Haley
 Robin Atkin Downes as The Guardian
 Shane Haboucha as Dick Grayson / Robin
 David Hunt as Harry
 Vicki Lewis as Iris West
 Joe Mantegna as Crooner
 Vanessa Marshall as Amazon Woman
 Jim Meskimen as Slam Bradley
 James Arnold Taylor as Captain Cold
 John F. Kennedy as himself (archive sound)

Production

Music
 

Like Superman: Doomsday, Justice League: The New Frontier had a soundtrack released by La-La Land Records on March 18, 2008. The music was composed by Kevin Manthei, the track listing is as follows.

Home media
Justice League: The New Frontier is available from Warner Bros. Home Entertainment on Digital and in single and two-disc editions. The DVD cover of the single disc includes the panoramic image from the film, while the two-disc, DVD Special Edition, HD DVD and Blu-ray commemorative editions have an image of Superman, Batman and Wonder Woman above the title logo with other characters below it. Best Buy had an exclusive deal which included a Green Lantern action figure from DC Direct with the DVD package. Wal-Mart had an exclusive single DVD package with "The New Frontier Green Lantern" CD-ROM Comic Book inside. The single, two-disc and Blu-ray editions were released on February 26, 2008, with the HD DVD edition released on March 18, 2008. In October 2017 WBHE released the Commemorative Edition of the film on Blu-ray combo pack, Blu-ray steelbook and DVD.

The special features include a documentary on the 47-year history of the Justice League, commentaries, a documentary on the early mythological villain archetypes in the Justice League stories, a featurette on the themes, elements from the comic to film versions of New Frontier, three episodes of Justice League Unlimited and a 10-minute preview of the animated film; Batman: Gotham Knight. Variety said that pre-orders for The New Frontier were greater than expected at that time.

Tie-in Media
On March 5, 2008, a one-shot called "Justice League: The New Frontier Special" was published.  Written by Darwyn Cooke & penciled by Cooke, Dave Bullock and J. Bone, this serves as an anthology consisting of various tales set within the events of the film.  In the comic, Batman goes to war with Superman after the latter is ordered by King Faraday and Pres. Eisenhower to arrest him for his vigilante activities, Robin & Kid Flash team up to prevent Soviet saboteurs from harming the President, while Wonder Woman and Black Canary look to calm the sexist natures of various male patrons within a new Gotham club.

Reception
Justice League: The New Frontier received mostly positive reviews. Screener copies were sent to website reviewers a month before the DVD's official release. Most of the reviews were positive and geared up the film's release even more. Newsarama reviewed the film, saying that it was "one of the best things to ever come out of [Bruce] Timm's stable", and said that the acting was exceptional. The World's Finest, a fansite dealing with DC Animations, said that it was "the first animated feature in a long time that I've felt completely satisfied while walking away from." A reviewer from Ain't It Cool News said that it was "my favorite film of 2008", and that it was "everything I had hoped for." Mainstream websites made similar comments; IGN gave the film and DVD a total score of 7.0, ENI said it was enjoyable, and DVDTalk.com said it was "recommended".

The film earned $6,133,996 from domestic DVD sales and $6,133,996 from domestic Blu-ray sales.

Awards and nominations

References

External links
 
 
 Justice League: The New Frontier @ The World's Finest
 Justice League: The New Frontier Trailer Trailer (Windows Media)
 Justice League: The New Frontier Trailer Trailer (QuickTime)

2008 films
2008 animated films
2008 science fiction films
2008 direct-to-video films
2000s American animated films
2000s animated superhero films
2000s English-language films
American animated science fiction films
Animated crime films
Animated superhero crossover films
Animated war films
Cold War films
Animated Justice League films
Looney Tunes films
Bugs Bunny films
Animated films about dinosaurs
Animated films about extraterrestrial life
Films set in the 1950s
Films set in 1953
Films set in 1954
Films set in 1955
Films set in 1957
Films set in 1958
Films set in 1959
Films set in 1960
Films directed by Dave Bullock
Films scored by Kevin Manthei
DC Universe Animated Original Movies
Toonami